Eventration is the protrusion of contents of the abdomen through a defect or weakness in the abdominal wall. This can refer to:
 Diaphragmatic eventration
 Herniation
 Evisceration (disambiguation)